In mathematics, a semimodule over a semiring R is like a module over a ring except that it is only a commutative monoid rather than an abelian group.

Definition
 
 
 
 
 .

A right R-semimodule can be defined similarly. For modules over a ring, the last axiom follows from the others. This is not the case with semimodules.

Examples
If R is a ring, then any R-module is an R-semimodule. Conversely, it follows from the second, fourth, and last axioms that (-1)m is an additive inverse of m for all , so any semimodule over a ring is in fact a module.
Any semiring is a left and right semimodule over itself in the same way that a ring is a left and right module over itself. Every commutative monoid is uniquely an -semimodule in the same way that an abelian group is a -module.

References

Algebraic structures
Module theory